Kalgoorlie is the central suburb of the Kalgoorlie–Boulder metropolitan area in the Goldfields–Esperance region of Western Australia.

References

Suburbs of Kalgoorlie-Boulder